Roke telkom  is a  telecommunications company based in Uganda. It was licensed by  Uganda Communications Commission in 2006.

Location
The headquarters and main office of Roke Telkom are located at Guardian Georgia Building,
Plot 67 Spring Road, Bugolobi in Nakawa Division, Kampala District. The coordinates of the company headquarters are 0°18'59"N 32°34'56"E (Latitude: 0.31628; Longitude:32.58219).

History 
In January 2006, Roke Telkom launched its operations in  Uganda. and it was licensed by the Uganda Communications Commission (UCC) as a Public Service Provider (capacity resale, voice and data) and Public Infrastructure Provider in 2006. In 2015, Roke Telkom entered a partnership with Google which enabled the company to increase its fibre footprint.

Overview 
Roke Telkom was the first telecommunications company to roll out a fibre connection between Uganda and Tanzania. The company   fibre network and fixed wireless network, connecting both multi branch enterprises and residences.

References

External links
Home | Roke Telkom
Roke Telkom | Company Profiles
https://www.dnb.com/business-directory/company-profiles.roke_telkom_ltd.6bdb22d87f14c924ece06b5572232488.html
Roke Telkom: Are Roke At Home data plans worth it?
Airtel, MTN, Africell, Roke Telkom and more to use Raxio's carrier neutral Data Center

    

Companies based in Kampala
Telecommunications companies established in 2006
2006 establishments in Uganda
Telecommunications companies of Uganda
Mobile phone companies of Uganda